() is the debut studio album by Spanish music act Rigoberta Bandini, released independently in October 2022 during an extended tour.

Background 
Early in the summer of 2022, Paula Ribó, frontwoman of Rigoberta Bandini, announced that the act would take a hiatus from their continuous touring after the summer, and would also release an album by the end of the year. The album was released on 7 October 2022, with the last planned date of the tour at the Palau Sant Jordi on 24 November (not including a Christmas concert on 23 December).

Ribó had contented herself with releasing only singles in the first few years of her career as Rigoberta Bandini, but in March 2022, after being thrust into the national spotlight with the popularity of "Ay mamá", she  in a way to help her compartmentalise eras of her career.

The title La Emperatriz (The Empress) refers to the tarot card The Empress, which was used as the cover art for "Ay mamá". Ribó has described her connection to the card on several occasions, and said that the symbols of the card also reflect her journey as an artist since the start of Rigoberta Bandini.

Music 
Twelve songs feature on the album, eight of which are previously-released popular singles. The four new songs are "Canciones de Amor a Ti", "Tú y Yo", "Que Vivir Sea un Jardín" and "La Emperatriz". The new songs continue Ribó's themes of motherhood and feminism in her music. Ribó said that the connecting thread of the songs is simply what she would like her artistic legacy to be if she were to suddenly disappear. While Rigoberta Bandini's music is typically electronic dance in genre, La Vanguardia wrote that the new songs do not initially seem to make the listener want to get up and dance, with Ribó agreeing that after the dancing she had wanted to create more intimate music.

The song "Tú y yo" was written when Ribó caught COVID-19 over Christmas when her son was six months old, and had to isolate without him.

Most of the songs were produced by Ribó, Esteban Navarro, and Estefano Macarrone. "Too Many Drugs" and "La Emperatriz" were produced by Santos & Fluren.

Release 

Track listing

Charts

Weekly charts

Year-end charts

References

Albums by Spanish artists